The International Journal of Behavioral Nutrition and Physical Activity is an open access medical journal covering behavioral aspects of nutrition and the study of physical activity, including a rigorous peer review process. It is the official journal of the International Society of Behavioral Nutrition and Physical Activity. It  was established in 2004 and is published by BioMed Central, part of Springer Nature. Leading a large international editorial board, the editor-in-chief is Professor Richard Rosenkranz, University of Nevada, Las Vegas, USA. According to the Journal Citation Reports, the journal has a 2021 impact factor of 8.925.<

References

External links

Nutrition and dietetics journals
BioMed Central academic journals
Publications established in 2004
English-language journals